Justin Erasmus (born 22 January 1990) is a South African Australian professional baseball pitcher for the Heidenheim Heideköpfe of the Baseball Bundesliga. Although Erasmus was born in South Africa, he grew up in Brisbane, Australia where he started his baseball career and has represented both countries.

Career
Erasmus was signed by the Red Sox as an international free agent in 2007. He was named to the South Africa national baseball team for the 2009 World Baseball Classic where he started against Mexico, giving up an RBI double and two-run home-run to Adrián González, finishing the tournament 0-1 with a 9.00 ERA.

While in the Gulf Coast League, Erasmus kept his ERA to 2.09 while pitching over 56 innings. In Australia, Justin debuted for the Brisbane Bandits on 13 November 2010 against the Perth Heat. In 6 games, including 3 starts he conceded a 6.38 ERA over 18.1 innings in the hitter-friendly Australian Baseball League.

In  Erasmus was promoted to the Greenville Drive in Low-A where he pitched an even more outstanding 1.11 ERA over 40.2 innings. His performance earned him a callup to the Australia national baseball team for the 2011 Baseball World Cup where he conceded 1 earned run over 2 innings, picking up the win against Germany.

Erasmus's brother Bradley represented South Africa as a catcher in the 2006 World Baseball Classic.

References

External links

1990 births
Living people
Australian expatriate baseball players in Germany
Australian expatriate baseball players in the Netherlands
Australian expatriate baseball players in the United States
Baseball pitchers
Baseball players from Brisbane
Brisbane Bandits players
De Glaskoning Twins players
Fargo-Moorhead RedHawks players
Gateway Grizzlies players
Gulf Coast Red Sox players
Greenville Drive players
Joliet Slammers players
Melbourne Aces players
Schaumburg Boomers players
South African emigrants to Australia
South African expatriate baseball players in the United States
South African expatriate sportspeople in Germany
South African expatriate sportspeople in the Netherlands
Sportspeople from Johannesburg
White South African people
2009 World Baseball Classic players
2017 World Baseball Classic players